April 4 – Eastern Orthodox liturgical calendar – April 6

All fixed commemorations below are observed on April 18 by Eastern Orthodox Churches on the Old Calendar.

For April 4th, Orthodox Churches on the Old Calendar commemorate the Saints listed on March 23.

Saints

 Martyrs Claudius, Diodorus, Victor, Victorinus, Pappias, Serapion and Nicephorus, at Corinth (251 or 258)
 Martyrs Theodulus, Reader, and Agathopodes, Deacon, and those with them, at Thessaloniki (c. 303)  (see also: April 4 - Greek)
 Martyrs Zenon, by fire, Maximus, Terentius and Pompeius, by the sword (250)  (see also: October 28, March 13, April 10)
 Martyr Thermos (Fermus, Firmus), by fire.
 The Holy Noble Lady (sister of martyr Thermos/Fermus), and her Servant, martyrs, by the sword.
 Holy Five Young Virgin-Martyrs of Lesbos, by the sword.
 Virgin-martyr Theodora and Martyr Didymus the Soldier, of Alexandria (304)  (see also: May 27)
 Venerable Martyr Ypomoni (Hypomoni, Evpomoni).
 Venerable Publius of Egypt, monk (4th century)  (see also: April 4 - Greek)
 Saints Theonas, Symeon, and Phorbinus, of Egypt (4th century)  (see also: April 4 - Greek)
 Venerable Mark the Anchorite of Athens (ca. 400)
 Venerable Plato the Confessor, Abbot of the Studion (813)  (see also: April 4 - Greek)
 Venerable Theodora of Thessaloniki (886)

Pre-Schism Western saints

 Holy Martyrs of North-West Africa, a large group martyred at the Easter liturgy by Genseric, the Arian King of the Vandals (459)
 Saint Bécán (Began), one of the 'Twelve Apostles of Ireland' (6th century)
 Venerable Derfel-Gadarn, a soldier and afterwards a hermit in Llanderfel in Gwynedd in Wales (6th century)  (see also: April 6 - Greek)
 Saint Æthelburh of Kent (c. 647)

Post-Schism Orthodox saints

 Saint  Argyre the Neomartyr of Prussa (1721)
 New Martyr George of New Ephesus (1801)
 New Martyr Panagiotes of Jerusalem (1820)

New martyrs and confessors

 New Hieromartyr Alexis Krotenkov, Priest (1930)
 New Hieromartyr Nicholas Simo, Archpriest, of Kronstadt  (1931)

Other commemorations

 Translation of the relics (1652) of St. Job, Patriarch of Moscow (1607)
 Martyrdom of the Optina monastics (Optina martyrs) on Pascha (1993): 
 Hieromonk Vasily (Roslyakov); with Riassaphore-monks Therapontus (Pushkarev), and Trophimus (Tatarinov).
 Repose of Righteous Symeon Klimych (1837)
 Repose of Elder Philemon of Valaam and Jordanville (1953)

Icon gallery

Notes

References

Sources
 April 5 / April 18. Orthodox Calendar (pravoslavie.ru).
 April 18 / April 5. Holy Trinity Russian Orthodox Church  (A parish of the Patriarchate of Moscow).
 April 5. OCA - The Lives of the Saints.
 The Autonomous Orthodox Metropolia of Western Europe and the Americas. St. Hilarion Calendar of Saints for the year of our Lord 2004. St. Hilarion Press (Austin, TX). p. 26.
 April 5. Latin Saints of the Orthodox Patriarchate of Rome.
 The Roman Martyrology. Transl. by the Archbishop of Baltimore. Last Edition, According to the Copy Printed at Rome in 1914. Revised Edition, with the Imprimatur of His Eminence Cardinal Gibbons. Baltimore: John Murphy Company, 1916. pp. 96–97.
 Rev. Richard Stanton. A Menology of England and Wales, or, Brief Memorials of the Ancient British and English Saints Arranged According to the Calendar, Together with the Martyrs of the 16th and 17th Centuries. London: Burns & Oates, 1892. pp. 144–145.
Greek Sources
 Great Synaxaristes:  5 Απριλίου. Μεγασ Συναξαριστησ.
  Συναξαριστής. 5 Απριλίου. ecclesia.gr. (H Εκκλησια Τησ Ελλαδοσ). 
Russian Sources
  18 апреля (5 апреля). Православная Энциклопедия под редакцией Патриарха Московского и всея Руси Кирилла (электронная версия). (Orthodox Encyclopedia - Pravenc.ru).
  18 апреля 2013 (нов. ст.) . Русская Православная Церковь Отдел внешних церковных связей.

April in the Eastern Orthodox calendar